"Bleed" is a song by American rock band Hot Chelle Rae. It was released as the second single from their first studio album Lovesick Electric on August 3, 2010. The song peaked at number 31 on the US Mainstream Top 40.

Music video
A music video to accompany the release of "Bleed" was first released onto YouTube on 2 April 2010 at a total length of three minutes and forty-six seconds.

Track listing

Charts

Release history

References 

2010 singles
Hot Chelle Rae songs
2009 songs
Jive Records singles
Songs written by Keith Follesé
Songs written by Nick Trevisick